The First Paksas Cabinet was the 9th cabinet of Lithuania since 1990. It consisted of the Prime Minister and 14 government ministers.

History 
Rolandas Paksas of the Homeland Union was appointed the Prime Minister by President Valdas Adamkus on 1 June 1999, after the resignation of the preceding Vagnorius Cabinet. The government received its mandate and started its work on 10 June 1999, after the Seimas gave assent to its program.

The government served for less than five months before it was brought down by disagreements over privatization. The government resigned on 27 October 1999 but continued to serve in an acting capacity (with Irena Degutienė as the acting Prime Minister), until the new Homeland Union government headed by Andrius Kubilius started its work on 11 November 1999.

Rolandas Paksas would later lead the another short-lived government between 2000 and 2001.

Cabinet
The following ministers served on the First Paksas Cabinet.

References 

Cabinet of Lithuania
1999 establishments in Lithuania
1999 disestablishments in Lithuania
Cabinets established in 1999
Cabinets disestablished in 1999